The Dark Side of the Moo is an unofficial compilation of early recordings by the English rock group Pink Floyd, featuring recordings not available on albums released in the US. Unlike other bootlegs containing previously unheard material (bootleg recordings), the album is made up of recordings that had at least one commercial release.

The name parodies The Dark Side of the Moon, the band's most commercially successful album, and the front cover of Atom Heart Mother, which featured a cow.

Background
The album was created by an anonymous label known as "Trixie Records" by a bootlegger known as "Richard", and to avoid detection by authorities, used an early name for the group, "The Screaming Abdabs" on the record label. "Richard" created the bootleg because he was frustrated at the amount of material that had been released by the band but had not found its way onto any widely available album, even compilations such as Relics, or even seen a US release. He said that a key motivation for creating it was for the cover, for which he created his own photograph of a cow in a field.

Reception

Reviewing the bootleg, Ritchie Unterberger recommended it for fans trying to complete a collection of Floyd recordings, saying "If you're not inclined to spend an additional 50 dollars or so tracking these down, it certainly makes sense to spring for this, if you can find it." The record was alleged to have sold 15,000 copies, and was praised for its high fidelity. "Richard" claimed it was the best selling bootleg out of several he produced, and was still selling it in the mid-1990s, years after its release.

Although some of the tracks are now more widely available than when the bootleg was first issued, some, such as "Point Me at the Sky", have still not been released on a regular album ("Point Me at the Sky" was, however, issued as part of the bonus "Early Singles" disc on the Shine On box set in 1992).

Track listing

References

External links

Pink Floyd compilation albums
Albums produced by Norman Smith (record producer)
Bootleg recordings